Bigoli in salsa is a Venetian pasta dish made with whole-wheat bigoli pasta, onion and salt-cured fish. While today usually anchovy is used, in earlier days it was often prepared with sardines. It is considered one of the signature dishes of Venice.

In Castel d'Ario, in the province of Mantua, on the first day of Lent, the "Bigolada" is held, a square party where dishes of "bigoi con le sardelle" are served.

See also
 List of pasta dishes
 Venetian cuisine

Notes

References

External links
 Cook in Venice recipe

Italian sauces
Pasta dishes
Cuisine of Veneto
Anchovy dishes